Francis Xavier Suarez (born October 6, 1977) is an American lawyer and politician serving as the 43rd mayor of Miami, Florida. He was elected on November 7, 2017, with 86 percent of the vote and was re-elected on November 2, 2021, with 78 percent of the vote. He is a registered Republican, but the office of the Miami mayor is nonpartisan. He previously served as City of Miami Commissioner for District 4, a position he held since he was elected in a runoff election on November 17, 2009. Suarez is the son of former Miami mayor and former Miami-Dade County Commissioner Xavier Suarez.

Suarez is the first ever local-born Miami mayor. He is also the first mayor to not be born in Cuba since 1996, when mayor Stephen P. Clark died in office.

Suarez also serves as vice-chair of the Miami-Dade Transportation Planning Organization (TPO) and is the former President of the Miami-Dade County League of Cities. In his role at the TPO, Suarez championed the Strategic Miami Area Rapid Transit (SMART) Plan, which was unanimously approved. The SMART Plan expands mass transit options in Miami-Dade County through six main corridors and new bus routes.

In June 2020, he was elected by American mayors to serve as the Second Vice President of the United States Conference of Mayors and in June 2021, he was elected as the First Vice President of the organization. He is currently serving as the president of the US Conference of Mayors for the 2022–2023 term.

Early life and education
The oldest of four siblings, Suarez is the son of two-time Miami mayor Xavier Suarez. His aunt, Lala, is the mother of U.S. Congressman Alex Mooney from West Virginia.

Suarez attended Immaculata-LaSalle High School. He graduated in 1996 and went on to graduate in the top 10% of his class from Florida International University with a bachelor's degree in finance. Following college, Suarez chose to attend the University of Florida Fredric G. Levin College of Law, receiving his J.D. degree cum laude in 2004. He then became an attorney with the law firm Greenspoon Marder, specializing in corporate and real estate transactions.

Career

Miami Commission (2009–2017)
Suarez was first elected as City of Miami Commissioner for District 4 in 2009. The general election to replace Tomás Regalado was on November 3, 2009. Suarez made it to the runoff election against Manolo Reyes after he received 44.74% of the vote, while Reyes received 40.50%. The other candidates in the general election were Denis Rod who had 5.15% and Oscar Rodriguez-Fonts with 9.61%.

The runoff election was on November 17, 2009. Suarez won with 51.41% of the vote. He was reelected unopposed in 2011 and 2015.

Mayor of Miami (2017–present)
As Mayor, Suarez has overseen a $400 million municipal bond initiative, sometimes called the Miami Forever Bond, to combat rising sea levels and support affordable housing.

In January 2019, he told the Miami Herald that his three major themes for governance would be quality of life, a pathway to prosperity, and resiliency. Suarez claimed that Miami benefitted from his leadership with a new online permitting system and a historically low homicide rate, among other things.

In February 2019, he wrote an article with former Secretary-General of the United Nations Ban Ki-moon about how Miami is defending itself from the effects of climate change.

Suarez is a cryptocurrency-friendly politician, who has promoted the development of Miami as a cryptocurrency hub. In 2021, Suarez was included in Fortune magazine's "World's 50 Greatest Leaders" list. In September 2021, he revealed that his ultimate plan for the city of Miami is to abolish taxes. Instead, he hopes to fund the city's activities via the issuance and continued mining of a city-specific blockchain token called MiamiCoin - which has led to him being nicknamed "Mayor Ponzi Postalita" by documentary-maker and director Billy Corben. He also stated that Miami is looking to allow its residents to get paid in bitcoin, and to be able to pay their taxes using bitcoin. In November 2021, Suarez became the first U.S. politician to take their salary in crypto. 

In 2018, Suarez voted against Republican nominee and later Governor of Florida Ron DeSantis in the 2018 Florida gubernatorial election and instead voted for his Democratic opponent Andrew Gillum for which he was criticized by fellow Republicans. Suarez did not vote for the Incumbent Republican Donald Trump in the 2020 presidential election.

Suarez was re-elected in the 2021 election, receiving over 78% of the vote in the first ballot.

Response to COVID-19 pandemic

On March 2, 2020, Suarez responded to the COVID-19 pandemic by announcing preparations for a potential outbreak in Miami. Though no cases had yet to reported in Miami, two cases were confirmed by the U.S. Centers for Disease Control and Prevention (CDC) in other areas of the state of Florida. On March 4, 2020. Suarez announced plans to cancel the upcoming Ultra Music Festival, stating that the tourists attending would greatly enhance the likelihood of Miami having cases of COVID-19. On March 6, 2020, Suarez and the Miami municipal government responded to the outbreak, which by then had resulted in even more confirmed coronavirus cases in the state of Florida, by cancelling the local Calle Ocho Festival as well. Suarez and two other city officials confirmed this during a press conference.

Suarez contracted the virus, which he confirmed during an interview with the Miami Herald on March 13. He was the second person confirmed to be infected in Miami-Dade County. He began posting daily video diaries to Instagram, showing the progression of his COVID-19 infection.

In July 2020, Suarez dedicated 39 police officers to the task of enforcing a Miami-wide mask-wearing ordinance.

2024 presidential election speculation 
In April 2021, reports that Suarez could serve as a running-mate to potential 2024 presidential candidate Nikki Haley emerged. A report by The Hill in September 2021 indicated that Suarez is interested in running for President in his own right.

See also
 List of mayors of the 50 largest cities in the United States

References

External links
 Miami Mayor's website

1977 births
21st-century American politicians
American politicians of Cuban descent
Florida International University alumni
Florida lawyers
Florida Republicans
Fredric G. Levin College of Law alumni
Hispanic and Latino American mayors in Florida
Hispanic and Latino American politicians
Living people
Mayors of Miami
Politicians from Miami
Presidents of the United States Conference of Mayors
Latino conservatism in the United States